Philip Johnson (born 1972), is an architect and Senior Principal for Populous, he led the design of the London Stadium for the London 2012 Olympic Games.

Education 
Johnson was educated at Abingdon School from 1983-1990, where he first designed a shop front for a local printing shop. He built sets for productions that included The Cherry Orchard, Captain Stirrick, Amadeus and Ubu Rex, in the Amey Theatre and Arts Centre.

He later attended Kingston University and University College London, where he studied architecture.

Career 
He started working for Populous in 2001 and was later promoted to Senior Principal.

He was tasked with leading the design of the Olympic Stadium and its transformation for post 2012. This included creating a sustainable Legacy of the 2012 Summer Olympics and integration into the urban park. He led a team of 50 architects.

The work won a Royal Institute of British Architects award and was shortlisted for the Stirling Prize.

His other works have included projects at the All England Lawn Tennis and Croquet Club, Lord's and Ascot Racecourse.

See also
 List of Old Abingdonians

References

Living people
1972 births
People educated at Abingdon School
Sports venue architects